Jeopardy! is an American television game show created by Merv Griffin, in which contestants are presented with trivia clues in the form of answers and must phrase their responses in the form of a question. The show has experienced a long life in several incarnations over the course of nearly a half-century, spending more than 12 years as a daytime network program and having currently run in syndication for 39 seasons. It has also gained a worldwide following with a multitude of international adaptations.

1964–1975

Original series (1964–1975)
The original Jeopardy! series, hosted by Art Fleming, premiered at 11:30a.m. Eastern (10:30 Central) on March 30, 1964, originating from studios at the NBC headquarters in New York City's 30 Rockefeller Plaza. NBC moved the program to 12:00 noon Eastern (11:00a.m. Central) after 18 months, making it accessible to businessmen coming home for their lunch break or else watching it on restaurant or bar sets, and college students departing their classes for the day watching it on student center or dormitory sets. These two constituencies, who ordinarily did not have the time or interest to view other daytime programs, made the show a runaway hit, propelling its ratings to second place among all daytime game shows by the end of the decade—second only to its immediate lead-in, The Hollywood Squares. The show had practically no trouble whatsoever against soap operas such as Love of Life and Where the Heart Is on CBS and mostly sitcom reruns on ABC.

In 1973, Lin Bolen, then Vice President of Daytime Programming at NBC, began eliminating longer-running game shows from the network in an aggressive attempt to bolster ratings among women aged 18 to 34, a desirable demographic to advertisers on daytime programs of that day; Jeopardy! had not performed especially strongly among those viewers, despite its overwhelming success among men and young people. Refreshing the daytime lineup became especially imperative to Bolen when CBS launched a surprise success in the soap opera The Young and the Restless at 12:00p.m. EST (11:00a.m. CST) in March 1973, drawing away younger audiences in particular. Although Jeopardy! continued to produce high ratings in the 12:00 noon time slot (also against the ABC revival of Password), Bolen moved the game to 10:30a.m. Eastern (9:30 Central) on January 7, 1974, putting it up against CBS' The $10,000 Pyramid, to make room for Jackpot!, a stylish, youth-oriented riddle contest hosted by Geoff Edwards, in Jeopardy! former timeslot. Bolen and other NBC executives were surprised, though, when Jeopardy! actually beat Pyramid for several weeks in February and March, prompting CBS to cancel Pyramid for failing to draw, according to packager Bob Stewart (who also produced Jackpot!), a 30 share that CBS daytime executives required a show to have in order to stay on its daytime schedule (Pyramid returned several weeks later on ABC in an afternoon slot and went on to become one of the most popular games of the 1970s and 1980s). CBS relocated Gambit to 10:30a.m. on April 1, which ran about even with Jeopardy! in the ratings, with Gambit having perhaps a slight lead, due to its more traditional housewife target audience. Remarkably, Jeopardy! stayed strong despite losing much of its core audience, who was usually either at work or in classrooms during that hour and thus could not watch the show then.

However, Bolen was not interested in seeing an aging show like Jeopardy! stand in the way of her plans for a more youthful image for NBC's daytime lineup, so she resolved to prepare it for eventual cancellation, a rare instance of a network deliberately trying to undermine one of its programs. So, on July 1 of the same year, NBC moved Jeopardy! to yet another timeslot, this time to 1:30p.m. EST (12:30p.m. CST) (replacing Three on a Match, yet another Bob Stewart-produced game) and placed it against ABC's Let's Make a Deal and CBS' As the World Turns, both of which had easily beaten the ratings of several programs placed in that same time slot by NBC since December 1968. At that time, Deal moved to ABC from NBC, which had carried it in that very time slot during much of the 1960s, in a dispute by packagers Stefan Hatos and Monty Hall over the latter network's refusal to make a weekly primetime version of the show permanent.

With the July move, many of the previously tenaciously-devoted viewers began abandoning the program; most of the remaining ones were either middle-aged housewives or elderly retirees, two groups undesirable to advertisers due to their usually fixed retail brand preferences, rendering them unpersuadable to try new ones. As such, advertising revenues fell, a scenario not helped by the severe economic recession occurring in late 1974. Jeopardy! became the seventh show since 1968 to fail at 1:30p.m. EST (12:30p.m. CST), and a cancellation notice was issued by November 1974. Its replacement was the expansion of Another World to a full hour, the first daytime serial to expand to that duration; in April 1975, another serial, Days of Our Lives began occupying that time slot and eventually brought success to NBC there. Jeopardy! broadcast the 2,753rd and final episode of its original network run on January 3, 1975. Some affiliates, including KNBC in Los Angeles, aired reruns in various other timeslots through the first quarter of that year. To compensate Griffin for canceling the program, which still had a year left on its contract, NBC purchased Wheel of Fortune, another creation of his, which premiered on January 6, 1975 (the following Monday) at 10:30a.m. Eastern (9:30 Central).

Weekly syndicated version (1974–1975)
Griffin secured the rights from NBC to produce new episodes for first-run syndication, with Metromedia (who also syndicated Griffin's popular talk show) as their distributor. Griffin took this action mainly to keep the show in production in light of the show's deteriorating ratings on NBC daytime that eventually led to the 1975 cancellation. NBC had repeatedly refused Griffin's requests to do so in the past. These episodes began airing weekly in September 1974 and featured many contestants who were previous champions on the NBC version. Thirty-nine episodes were produced, with reruns of this version also airing in syndication through about summer 1975. Most stations aired this during the Prime Time Access slots in the early evening before network primetime programming began, usually in a "checkerboard" pattern with other weekly shows, meaning a different syndicated show aired each night, like the networks in prime time. By 1974, though, the market was flooded with evening versions of network games like the Hollywood Squares and The Price Is Right, and Jeopardy!, already on a popularity downswing for some time, did not get anywhere near nationwide clearance, thus dooming it to failure after one season.

Unique to this version was a bonus awarded at the end of the program, after Final Jeopardy! was completed. The episode's champion selected a prize hidden behind the thirty squares on the Jeopardy! board. Among the prizes was a $25,000 cash award which was hidden behind two squares. In order to win the top prize, the champion had to find both $25,000 cards in succession (winning the prize on a second pick if it was not the latter half of the grand prize). In later episodes, the bonus board was dropped and the evening's champion received a prize based upon his or her final score, with a Chevrolet Vega or Chevrolet Caprice (or even additional cash prizes of $10,000 or $25,000) as possibilities.

The All-New Jeopardy! (1978–1979)
Launching on October 2, 1978, the revived Jeopardy! took the spot of the soap opera For Richer, For Poorer on NBC's daytime schedule and initially aired weekdays at 10:30a.m. From its debut until January 5, 1979, Jeopardy! aired against the first half-hour of the hit show The Price Is Right, which aired on CBS. As such, the show found itself unable to build an audience.

On January 8, 1979, NBC moved Jeopardy! from 10:30a.m. to noon, the time slot the original series had occupied and done well in for many years. However, the television climate in 1979 was much different than it was in the 1960s and early 1970s. The 12:00p.m. hour was one that network affiliates often chose to preempt in favor of showing other programming such as a midday local newscast or a syndicated offering such as another game show or a talk show. In markets that did air Jeopardy! at noon, the show found itself losing the ratings battle against The $20,000 Pyramid on ABC and The Young and the Restless on CBS, two shows that, ironically enough, had competed against the original in 1974 and 1973, respectively. NBC decided to pull the plug on the revived Jeopardy! series shortly after the move, and its 108th and final episode aired on March 2, 1979. Its place on the schedule was taken by Password Plus, which at the time had been airing at 12:30p.m., and the cancellation allowed NBC to expand its top-rated soap opera, Another World, to ninety minutes from sixty, later in the afternoon.

Originating from the NBC Studios in Burbank, California, this version featured some unique gameplay elements of its own. In the most notable of these elements, the lowest scoring contestant was eliminated from further play after the Jeopardy! round. The remaining two contestants played the Double Jeopardy! round. In a second major change, no Final Jeopardy! round was played. Instead, the leader at the end of Double Jeopardy! was declared the day's champion.

Most notable among the changes, Final Jeopardy! was replaced with a bonus game called Super Jeopardy!, played for a cash bonus. The round consisted of five categories (instead of six as in the main game), each with five clues numbered 1 to 5. The object of the round was to answer five questions to create a horizontal, vertical, or diagonal line on the board. Contestants had to create the line before accumulating three strikes, which were given if a contestant either failed to respond (passing was not allowed without penalty) or gave an incorrect answer. If the contestant struck out, $100 was awarded for each correct answer given, but if the contestant was successful, he/she won $5,000. For each successive time a champion played the Super Jeopardy! round, regardless of whether or not the contestant had won the round the day before, he/she played for $2,500 more than he/she had the previous time—a second trip was played for $7,500, a third $10,000, a fourth $12,500, and a fifth and final trip $15,000. A contestant could earn $50,000 from Super Jeopardy! alone, provided that the contestant won each Super Jeopardy! round over a five-day reign as champion.

Fleming later stated that he disagreed with moving the show to southern California, as he considered the contestants there to not be as appealing as those who played the game in New York were. He cited it as one of the main reasons he did not return to the series when it was revived five years later.

1984–present
Following the success of the nighttime syndicated version of Wheel which had premiered in 1983, Griffin sold a new syndicated version of Jeopardy! to its same distributor, King World Productions (which much later folded into CBS Television Distribution, now CBS Media Ventures). This version introduced updated technology to the program, replacing the former manually-operated game board featuring clues printed on pull cards with television monitors to display clues. One significant difference from the 1964 to 1975 versions was that only the winning contestant kept his or her earnings, while the runners-up were awarded higher-end consolation prizes instead (changed in later years to $2,000 for second place and $1,000 for third). After Fleming declined to return to the show because of his dissatisfaction with the changes, Griffin took the advice of Lucille Ball, who recommended Alex Trebek for the position. Trebek, in turn, recommended Johnny Gilbert, whom he had met at a dinner party a few years prior, for the announcer position. 

The Trebek version debuted September 10, 1984. Trebek continued to host the program until his death in November 2020, with his final recorded episode airing January 8, 2021; a series of guest hosts helmed the series for the remainder of that season. Mike Richards, the show's executive producer, was named host prior to start of the 2021–22 season but resigned after the first week of episodes when a string of controversies emerged after Richards's hiring; Mayim Bialik and Ken Jennings (the latter being a consulting producer and prominent former contestant) have rotated as host since then.

Early years
Initially, Jeopardy! was relegated by managers of some television stations to unpopular time slots, and it was not unusual for both Jeopardy! and Wheel to air either non-consecutively, on different stations, or even against each other. However, the new version built upon early ratings successes in Cleveland and Detroit, where it was slotted in the same 7:00–8:00p.m. block (the Prime Time access hour) in which Wheel also appeared. Coinciding with the peak of popularity for the board game Trivial Pursuit and the installation of electronic trivia games (e.g. NTN Buzztime) in pubs and bars, Jeopardy! was slowly becoming a major success despite some markets still airing it in unfavorable time slots. One such market was New York City, the largest in the United States. There, King World sold its new show to WNBC, which had been the flagship of the original Jeopardy!. When it premiered in the fall of 1984, Jeopardy! initially aired at 1:30a.m. on WNBC, following Late Night with David Letterman.

Although the series was indeed proving to be a hit, its late timeslot in the country's largest media market began to concern its distributor. Even though Letterman's show and The Tonight Show Starring Johnny Carson were strong ratings winners and Jeopardy! was able to retain a good amount of the audience from its lead-in shows, a late-night timeslot is not usually considered beneficial for a first-run series, cutting out younger audiences with obligations to school or college, and older viewers. WNBC's more favorable fringe time and daytime slots were all filled with other programming, a situation that was also true at all of the other major stations in the city; WABC and WCBS also cleared their networks' schedules completely and had other programming, including other long-running syndicated game shows and reruns, filing the holes in their schedules, as did independents WNEW-TV, WOR-TV and WPIX, which also carried cartoons in addition to reruns. In addition, CBS and ABC at the time were still airing network programming until 4:30 p.m. Eastern, with ABC airing the long-running soap opera The Edge of Night and CBS running the game show Body Language.

On October 26, 1984, several weeks into Jeopardy!’s first season, Procter & Gamble Productions announced that it would cease production of The Edge of Night after 28 years and that ABC would no longer offer regular programming in the timeslot, with Edge's last episode airing December 28. King World went to WABC, who now had an open spot on its schedule it needed to fill, and the two struck an agreement to move Jeopardy! to the station beginning December 31, 1984. WABC has aired Jeopardy! in the New York market ever since, initially in the 4:00 p.m. time slot. The switch helped more viewers find Jeopardy!, since they no longer had to stay up past midnight to see it.

In Los Angeles, KCBS-TV picked up Jeopardy! to air at 4:00 p.m. as a lead-in to its local news at 4:30 p.m. Two months later, however, due to low ratings, KCBS replaced Jeopardy! with reruns of Quincy, M.E.. Shortly thereafter, Jeopardy! was picked up by then-independent station KCOP-TV, where it was paired with Wheel of Fortune. Jeopardy! later returned to KCBS in 1989 along with Wheel. Then three years later, both game shows were picked up by KABC-TV, where they remain as of October 2020.

Prime Time Access shakeup
WABC added Oprah to its lineup in the fall of 1986, and placed it at 10:00 a.m., following its locally-produced talk show The Morning Show. Having its roots in a local morning show at WABC's sister station in Chicago, Oprah was an immediate success and in December 1986, WABC decided to move it to the 4:00 p.m. timeslot. The move, which turned out to be permanent as Oprah remained at 4:00 p.m. for the next 24-plus years, displaced the game shows airing there and WABC needed to find a new home for Jeopardy!.

At the time, and like its major competitors, WABC aired an hour of local news at 6:00 p.m. and followed it with the national newscast, in this case World News Tonight, at 7:00 p.m. For the 1986–87 season, WABC added another new syndicated offering in a revival of Hollywood Squares, which was placed at 7:30 p.m. Squares turned out to be a strong performer against the immensely popular Wheel of Fortune on WCBS and, seeing those ratings, WABC decided that it could draw equal or better ratings with Jeopardy! in the 7:00 p.m slot. ABC did not require its stations to air World News Tonight at a specific time, giving WABC the freedom to make the move if it wanted.

On December 15, 1986, the same day Oprah moved to 4:00p.m., WABC reduced the 6:00p.m. broadcast of Eyewitness News by 30 minutes and moved World News Tonight to 6:30, with Jeopardy! airing at 7:00 and Squares following it at 7:30. To alert viewers to the timeslot changes, WABC launched an advertising campaign entitled "Prime Time Begins At 7 On 7". In addition, WABC filled part of Oprah's vacated 10:00a.m. slot with a repeat of the previous evening's broadcast of Jeopardy! until September 1987.

The move produced a ratings win in both the 6:30 and 7:00p.m. time slots, as World News Tonight also benefited from the switch; this, along with the rise of WABC's Eyewitness News in the New York ratings books, paved the way for WABC to become the most-watched television station in the New York market. Eventually, WCBS and WNBC capitulated, and their networks' respective national newscasts moved to 6:30p.m. as well. After moving the CBS Evening News to 6:30p.m. in the fall of 1988, WCBS picked up a nighttime syndicated edition of the NBC game show Win, Lose or Draw to air at 7:00p.m. as a lead-in for Wheel, while WNBC (which also moved NBC Nightly News to 6:30) eventually began airing newsmagazines (such as Inside Edition) and a new syndicated version of Family Feud hosted by Ray Combs (who also hosted the show's daytime revival on CBS) in the hour preceding primetime.

WABC has aired Jeopardy! at 7:00 ever since. Entertainment Tonight, which had been airing the previous two seasons on WWOR-TV (the former WOR-TV that had been sold the previous year in the midst of an unrelated ownership dispute), replaced Hollywood Squares as the Jeopardy! lead-out in fall 1988. In 1990,  Entertainment Tonight moved to WCBS as Wheel of Fortune went to WABC,  as WCBS had opted to air newsmagazine and entertainment programming in the early fringe timeslot; Wheel was paired with Jeopardy! and the two shows have remained on WABC ever since.

WABC's successful access hour move eventually resulted in many Eastern and Pacific Time Zone network affiliates moving their network newscasts to 6:30p.m. Affiliates in the Central and Mountain time zones generally program Wheel at 6:30p.m., though, and air their networks' respective newscasts at 5:30 p.m., with Jeopardy! largely airing in late afternoon (and in some cases, morning) timeslots, as these stations typically air local newscasts in the half-hour following their networks' respective national ones.

Jeopardy! has since become a staple syndicated show for ABC's owned-and-operated station group, and seven of its eight stations (WABC, KABC/Los Angeles, WLS/Chicago, WPVI/Philadelphia, KGO/San Francisco, WTVD/Raleigh-Durham and KFSN/Fresno) have carried the show along with Wheel since 1992. The only exception has long been KTRK in Houston, which had never carried both game shows in part due to an hour-long newscast in the Prime Time Access hour where Wheel is normally seen (and whose hour-long newscast predated parent company Capital Cities' acquisition of ABC in 1986); both game shows have aired on different Houston stations: first on NBC affiliate KPRC from their respective start dates until 1986, and then to CBS affiliate KHOU which also carried The Oprah Winfrey Show over its entire run (making KTRK the only ABC owned-and-operated station that never carried Oprah over its 25-year run). However, on September 14, 2015, KTRK began airing Jeopardy!, making it the last ABC-owned station to do so, though Wheel of Fortune continues to air on KHOU, as KTRK still carries an hour-long block of local newscasts (both separate half-hour newscasts, for ratings purposes) in the 6:00p.m. access hour.

Ratings and critical reception
Since its debut, the syndicated version of Jeopardy! has gone on to win sixteen Daytime Emmy Awards for Outstanding Game/Audience Participation Show, achieving this honor most recently in 2017, and today it holds the record as the most honored program in this Emmy award category.

The show was the subject of great interest and increased ratings (often out-performing Wheel and even some primetime programs) in the early portions of the 2004–05 season as contestant Ken Jennings, taking advantage of newly-relaxed appearance rules, won 74 matches before being defeated by Nancy Zerg in his 75th appearance. He amassed $2,520,700 over the course of his winning streak, as well as a $2,000 second-place prize in his 75th appearance, thus earning the record as the highest money-winner ever on American game shows, and his winning streak led the show to become TV's highest-rated syndicated program.

On September 11, 2006, with the start of Season 23, Jeopardy! began broadcasting in high definition. King World and production company Sony Pictures Television indicated that as of August 10, 2006, some 49 of the 210 stations that carried the show at that time were prepared for the transition. Sony uses the 1080i HD format to record the show, but since Jeopardy! is syndicated, stations using the 720p format had to manually transcode the show from an HD satellite feed before broadcasting it. This issue was remedied with the introduction of the Pathfire satellite system for high-definition syndicated content distribution.

On January 2, 2007, one third of the subscribing stations originally renewed Jeopardy! through Season 28 (2011–12), but by April 8, 2010, Jeopardy! was given an additional two-year renewal through Season 30 (2013–14). Then in 2012, Trebek and Wheel personalities Pat Sajak and Vanna White renewed their respective contracts when the shows' ABC-owned affiliates renewed both game shows through the 2015–16 season.

In November 2018, the ABC-owned-and-operated stations renewed their agreement to carry Wheel and Jeopardy! through 2023, rebuffing a larger contract offer from Fox Corporation. CBS has long viewed stability as key to the shows' success, desiring to keep the shows on ABC stations to maintain continuity; it has declined to move the shows to its own owned-and-operated station group for the same reason it rejected Fox's bid.

Syndication and reruns
CBS Media Ventures currently offers stations up to two episodes of Jeopardy! to air each weekday: the first run (which airs new episodes from September to July), and a "classic Jeopardy!" package consisting of episodes from the previous year. 

Some local TV stations which carry Jeopardy! also hold in-market on-demand streaming rights to the five most recent episodes, subject to technical capability. For example, Sinclair Broadcast Group's Stirr service began to carry the program in the markets where Sinclair stations air the program, such as Washington, D.C. (WJLA) and Seattle (KOMO), in late 2020. Outside of the U.S., Jeopardy! airs on Canadian stations Yes TV and CHEK.

Archival episode rights are held by Pluto TV, which like CBS Media Ventures is owned by Paramount. Pluto launched a continuous linear channel of episodes from the Trebek era in August 2022. The Pluto deal covers 250 episodes of the series spanning most of Trebek's hosting run, with an emphasis on major tournaments; an additional 250-episode batch will be added to the rotation in 2023. Select episodes of Jeopardy! had been available intermittently on Netflix until August 2021; the agreement with Pluto allows Sony to continue selling episodes of the series to subscription video-on-demand providers.

Spin-off programs

Jep! 

Jep!, a children's version of the show, aired first on Game Show Network (now known by its abbreviated name, "GSN") throughout the 1998–99 season, and then on Discovery Kids through late 2004. It was hosted by cartoon voice actor Bob Bergen, and produced by Scott Sternberg who had earlier produced a children's version of Wheel, titled Wheel 2000. Contestants on Jep! were young children aged 10 through 12, who competed for merchandise packages instead of monetary prizes, with clue values in points rather than dollars.

Rock & Roll Jeopardy! 

Rock & Roll Jeopardy!, a music-intensive version, debuted on VH1 on October 8, 1998 and ran for four seasons, ending on May 12, 2001. Hosted by Survivor star Jeff Probst, this version highlighted post-1950s popular music trivia rather than focusing on general knowledge. Announcers included Loretta Fox in seasons one and two, and Stew Herrera in seasons three and four.

Sports Jeopardy!

In fall 2014, Crackle, an online video portal owned by Sony, began exclusively carrying Sports Jeopardy!, a themed version of the show with material focused entirely on sports trivia. Sportscaster Dan Patrick hosts the series, which produces new episodes once a week. Kelly Miyahara, a member of the Jeopardy! Clue Crew, serves as an on-camera announcer. Howie Schwab serves as off-camera judge and consultant. The series was picked up by NBCSN for the 2016 season.

Each category has only four clues (250, 500, 750 and 1,000 in the Jeopardy! round, with those values doubled for Double Jeopardy!) compared to five in the parent series. The fewer clues allows Patrick and the contestants more time to interact during the interview portion of the show and during a "postgame" segment during and after the closing credits.

References

External links
 Official Website of Rock & Roll Jeopardy! (via Internet Archive)
 Official Website of Jep! (via Internet Archive)
 Official Website of Sports Jeopardy!
 
 

Broadcast Information
History of television in the United States
Television in the United States